Jürgen Röber (born 25 December 1953) is a German football manager and former player.

Playing career
Röber's Bundesliga career lasted 12 years with a one year interruption, when he played in Canada and England. His greatest success as a player was winning the national German championship with Bayern Munich in 1981. He played as a midfielder.

Coaching career
Röber started his manager career in 1991 at the club where he had ended his active career, Rot-Weiss Essen. His Bundesliga debut as manager was in 1994 with the VfB Stuttgart. His most successful time so far was as coach of Hertha BSC. In 1997, he led the team to promotion, only two years later Hertha finished at third position and made their entry into the Champions League.

After two more engagements at VfL Wolfsburg and Partizan he signed at Borussia Dortmund in December 2006. On 12 March 2007 he resigned, because he said he wasn't able "to reach the team".

Röber was with Saturn Ramenskoye from 21 August 2008 to 15 May 2009. Röber signed for Ankaraspor in summer 2009.

Coaching record

Honours

Player
Bayern Munich
 Bundesliga: 1980–81

Manager
Hertha BSC
DFL-Ligapokal: 2001

References

External links

NASL Profile

1953 births
Living people
German footballers
West German expatriate sportspeople in Canada
German football managers
Germany B international footballers
FK Partizan managers
Borussia Dortmund managers
VfB Stuttgart managers
VfL Wolfsburg managers
Hertha BSC managers
SV Werder Bremen players
Bayer 04 Leverkusen players
FC Bayern Munich footballers
Nottingham Forest F.C. players
Rot-Weiss Essen players
Bundesliga players
2. Bundesliga players
English Football League players
FC Saturn Ramenskoye managers
Russian Premier League managers
Bundesliga managers
2. Bundesliga managers
German expatriate football managers
Expatriate football managers in Russia
Expatriate football managers in Serbia and Montenegro
Expatriate football managers in Turkey
Rot-Weiss Essen managers
Süper Lig managers
German expatriate sportspeople in Turkey
Expatriate footballers in England
West German expatriate sportspeople in England
Calgary Boomers players
North American Soccer League (1968–1984) players
Association football midfielders
Footballers from Saxony-Anhalt
West German footballers
West German expatriate footballers
German expatriate sportspeople in Russia
German expatriate sportspeople in Serbia
German expatriate sportspeople in Belgium
Expatriate soccer players in Canada
People from Recklinghausen (district)
Sportspeople from Münster (region)
Footballers from North Rhine-Westphalia